Henry Hector McFie OBE (21 October 1869 – 2 January 1957) was an Australian politician. Born in Hobart, Tasmania, he was originally a member of the Labor Party but joined the Nationalist Party after the 1916 split over conscription. He was elected to the Tasmanian House of Assembly in 1925 as a Nationalist member for Darwin. He served until his defeat in 1934. Re-elected in 1941, he joined the Liberal Party in 1945 and retired in 1948.

References

1869 births
1957 deaths
Nationalist Party of Australia members of the Parliament of Tasmania
Liberal Party of Australia members of the Parliament of Tasmania
Members of the Tasmanian House of Assembly
Officers of the Order of the British Empire
Politicians from Hobart